Thomas II de Bermingham was an Anglo-Irish lord who died in 1473.

The succession to the lordship is unclear for much of the 15th and early 16th centuries. According to the annals, in 1426:
John, son of Mac Feorais Bermingham, was slain by Thomas, his own brother's son.

When Walter died in 1428, he was succeeded by a Thomas de Bermingham. The Complete Peerage states that this Thomas was a son of Walter.

References
 The Abbey of Athenry, Martin J. Blake, Journal of the Galway Archaeological and Historical Society, volume II, part ii, 1902
 The Birmingham family of Athenry, H. T. Knox, J.G.A.H.S., volume ten, numbers iii and iv, 1916-17.
 The Birmingham chalice, J. Rabbitte,  J.G.A.H.S., volume 17, i and ii, 1936-27
 The Second Battle of Athenry, Adrian James Martyn, East Galway News & Views, September 2008-April 2009

External links
 Medieval Ireland: an encyclopedia
 Edenderry Historical Society
 The Fitzgeralds: Barons of Offaly

People from County Galway
Barons Athenry
Thomas II